An anglicism is a word or construction borrowed from English by another language.

With the rise in Anglophone media and the global spread of British and US cultures in the 20th and 21st centuries, many English terms have become widespread in other languages. Technology-related English words like internet and computer are prevalent across the globe, as there are no pre-existing words for them. English words are sometimes imported verbatim and sometimes adapted to the importing language in a process similar to anglicisation. In languages with non-Latin alphabets, these borrowed words can be written in the Latin alphabet anyway, resulting in a text made up of a mixture of scripts; other times they are transliterated. Transliteration of English and other foreign words into Japanese generally uses the katakana script.

In some countries, such anglicisation is seen as relatively benign, and the use of English words may even take on a chic aspect. In Japan, marketing products for the domestic market often involves using English or pseudo-English brand names and slogans. In other countries, anglicisation is seen much more negatively, and there are efforts by public-interest groups and governments to reverse the trend.

It is also important to note that while the word anglicism is rooted in the word English, the process does not necessarily denote anglicisms from England. It can also involve terms or words from all varieties of English so that it becomes necessary to use the term Americanism for the loan words originating from the United States.

Definitions 

Definitions of anglicism differ significantly across various fields. The word is employed in various situations of language contact.

The criteria for being considered an anglicism by the Usage Dictionary of Anglicisms in Selected European Languages are as follows: a loanword that is recognisably English in form with regards to spelling, pronunciation and morphology. In this specific sense, loan translations and calques are excluded (as well as words that are etymologically derived from languages related to modern French).

Some see anglicisms as harmless and useful, others perceive them as bad influences to be countered.

Other definitions of anglicism include: a word or construction peculiar to English; a word or phrase that is peculiar to British English; or English syntax, grammar, or meaning transposed in another language resulting in incorrect language use or incorrect translation.

Adaptation 
A number of scholars agree that for anglicism to take place, adaptation must first occur such as in the case of the integration of a great number of anglicisms in Europe. Fischer said that it is similar to neologism in the sense that it completes several phases of integration, which include: 1) the beginning, when it is still new and not known to many speakers; 2) the phase where it begins to spread and take part in the process of institutionalization; and, 3) the word becomes part of the common core of the language. There are experts who propose a more detailed framework such as the model of anglicism adaptation that transpires on four levels: orthographic, phonological, morphological, and semantic.

By language

Chinese
These are English terms, expressions, or concepts that have been absorbed into the Chinese language, including any of its varieties, and should not be confused with Chinglish, the variety of the English language used by native Chinese speakers.

The origins of Chinese anglicisms vary, one of the most common being those obtained by phonetic borrowing. For example, a "bus" (in Mainland China or Taiwan) is usually called  in Hong Kong and Macao because its Cantonese pronunciation is similar to its English counterpart.

Finnish

The anglicisms can be divided to four types: direct phonetic imitation, lexical and grammatical calques, and contamination of orthography. Official language (as given by the Language Planning Office) deprecates Anglicisms, and for the most part, native constructions are sufficient even in spoken language. Nevertheless, some anglicisms creep in.

Computer jargon is generally full of direct imitation, e.g.  "swap". Other jargons with abundant anglicisms are pop music, scifi, gaming, fashion, automobile and to some extent scientific jargon. This is regarded a sign of overspecialization, if used outside the context of the jargon. Generally, direct imitation is not as common, but there are examples. For example, the word sexy , pronounced with an Y unlike in English , might be used as an adjective. This is teenager-specific.

Lexical calques take an English expression, like killer application, and produce , which does mean "an application that kills" just as in English. Readers need to know the equivalent English term to understand this.

Some speakers, especially those in frequent contact with the English language have created a grammatical calque of the English you-impersonal. The English impersonal utilizes the second person pronoun you, e.g. You can't live if you don't eat. Here, the word you does not refer explicitly to the listener, but signifies a general statement. When translated word-by-word, it will refer directly to the listener. Then, you will need to understand that it is an anglicism, or you can be offended by the commanding "You there!" tone produced. (There are also native examples of the same construction, so the origin of this piece of grammar may not always be English.)

An English orthographical convention is that compound words are written separately, whereas in Finnish, compound words are written together, using a hyphen with acronyms and numbers. In Finnish,  and  would be correct, but process engineering or Intel 80286 processor would not. Failure to join the words or omitting the hyphen can be either an honest mistake, or contamination from English.

Another orthographical convention is that English words tend to be written as the originals. Sometimes, it is even standard language, e.g. , instead of according to English pronunciation  .

French

A distinction is made between well-established English borrowings into French, and other words and structures regarded as incorrect. The term  is often pejorative, carries a large amount of political weight, and frequently denotes an excessive use of English in the French language.

French has many words of English origin for which the English roots are unknown or unrecognized due to a lack of salience or the length of time since the borrowing took place, as well as other words which are seen as English but that are well accepted as part of French (e.g., parking, week-end). These are not considered anglicisms but are fully accepted as French words by the Académie Française.

Occasionally governments and linguistic institutions of both Quebec and France have undertaken strenuous efforts to eradicate anglicisms, often by suggesting French replacements with French phonology and morphology. Although efforts in Quebec have been met with some success (e.g.,  for ), attempts by the Académie have largely been unsuccessful. Sociolinguists have attributed these failures to the general inability of linguistic institutions to enforce a linguistic norm. The Académie regularly updates a list of prescribed linguistic norms, many of which include using suggested French replacements instead of anglicisms (e.g.,  for ).

Replacements have taken many different forms. For example, in Quebec French, the portmanteau word  is increasingly gaining acceptance. Other replacements have various forms created by the Académie and office québécois de la langue française.

Quebec French and Metropolitan French tend to have entirely different anglicisms for historical reasons. Quebec French acquired its anglicisms in a gradual process of linguistic borrowing resulting from linguistic contact with English speakers for the roughly 250 years since the Battle of the Plains of Abraham of 1759. Metropolitan French, on the other hand, mostly adopted its anglicisms in recent decades due to the post-Second World War international dominance of English, or the rise of English as a lingua franca. Due to the differences in English borrowings between Canada and France, the people of Quebec and France often consider each other's anglicisms to be incorrect or humorous, while considering their own to be perfectly normal.

An example of a Metropolitan French anglicism not used in Quebec French:

An example of a Quebec French anglicism not used in France;

 : to French kiss

The social meaning and acceptance of anglicisms also differs from country to country due to the differences in the historical relationship to French. In Quebec, anglicisms are never used in formal documentation (government papers, instruction sheets) and very rarely used in informal writing (magazines, journals). In 1993, the French passed the legislation  which forbids the use of anglicisms (or those from other languages) in commercial and government publications. In both countries, wherever the use of an anglicism is unavoidable, it is often written in italics or in quotations.

Various anglicisms are largely differentiated on the way in which they entered the language. One type of anglicism is a calque, or a direct translation from English. For example, the valediction  is regarded as an anglicism, since it is a direct translation of the English "sincerely yours". Other anglicisms include the wholesale adoption of English terms such as "business" or "start-up". Additionally, some English words in French might not have the same meaning as those words in English.

Anglicism is a political term and does not necessarily indicate the etymology or history of the word itself. Rather, it indicates the common attitudes and perceptions about the (theoretically English) history of the word. For example, because English itself borrowed a great amount of French vocabulary after the Norman Conquest, some anglicisms are actually Old French words that dropped from usage in French over the centuries but were preserved in English and have now come full circle back into French. For instance, one attested origin of the verb "to flirt" cites influence from the Old French expression , which means "to (try to) seduce". Other possible origins for the word include , E. Frisian  (a flick or light stroke), and E. Frisian  (a giddy girl). This expression is no longer used in French, but the English Gallicism "to flirt" has now returned to French and is considered an anglicism, despite its likely French origins.

German

Denglisch is a pejorative term used in German describing the increased use of anglicisms and pseudo-anglicisms in the German language. The term is first recorded from 1965. To some extent, the influence of English on German can be from normal language contact. The term Denglisch is however mostly reserved for forced, excessive exercises in anglicization, or pseudo-anglicization, of the German language.

Italian
Under Benito Mussolini, efforts were made to purify Italian of anglicisms and other foreign words. Today, Italian is one of the most receptive languages for anglicisms.

Japanese

Anglicised words in Japanese are altered to reflect the absence of certain phonemes in Japanese, such as 'l' (changed to 'r') and 'v' (changed to 'b'). Other changes occur when, for example, an English word ending in "l" becomes "ru". For example, "hotel" becomes , as in the expression  (love hotel), the word  is strictly speaking not an anglicism, coming from the French  (with).

Latvian
The first anglicisms in the written sources of Latvian appear at the end of the 18th century, however, up until the middle 1970s they were barely researched as their number remained low and since they mostly appeared in the terminology of sports and engineering. The direct contact between Latvian and English at that time was very limited, thus most of the anglicisms entered Latvian through German or Russian. Ever since Latvia regained its independence, there has been an influx of anglicisms into the Latvian language due to the fact that media in English is more accessible than ever.

Polish

Sporadic linguistic contacts between Polish and English-speaking areas have been noted at least since the 15th century. However, most early anglicisms in Polish were mostly limited to names for places in Great Britain and the Americas. The first proper anglicisms were also related to geography and were recorded in an 18th-century work  by Franciszek Siarczyński. By the end of that century there were at least 21 lexemes of English provenance in Polish usage. The 1859 dictionary of foreign words by Michał Amszejewicz contains roughly 100 anglicisms, the so-called Vilnian dictionary of 1861 contains roughly 180 of such words. The anglicisms recorded in the 19th century were in large part words related to social, political, legal and economic concepts used in English society and lacking corresponding institutions in contemporary Poland. Another group comprised naval, sports-related and technical terms.

Typically new words were initially being written in their original form, especially when they were used to describe English or American contexts. Such was the case of the word budget, first recorded as such in 1792 in relation to English economy, but soon also used in Polish context.

The assimilation of new English words into Polish sped up in the 20th century and gradually English replaced Czech, German, French, Italian and other languages as the primary source of new imports into the Polish language. At the turn of the century there were roughly 250 English words in use, by 1961 the number of English lexemes in Polish rose to over 700, breaking 1000 lexemes in the 1980s and at least 1600 in 1994.

Borrowings from English language used in modern Polish fall into a number of thematic categories:
 Sports and healthcare: aerobic, lifting, jogging, peeling, jockey, ;
 Politics: , 

Take note, that some of the borrowed words already have Polish equivalents and therefore are not recognized by all language users:
  (manager) instead of 
  (quad bike) instead of 

In addition to lexical borrowings, there is also a number of calques in everyday use.

Spanish

Spanglish (a portmanteau of the words "Spanish" and "English") is a name sometimes given to various contact dialects, pidgins, or creole languages that result from interaction between Spanish and English used by people who speak both languages or parts of both languages, mainly spoken in the United States. It is a blend of Spanish and English lexical items and grammar. Spanglish can be considered a variety of Spanish with heavy use of English or vice versa. It can be more related either to Spanish or to English, depending on the circumstances. Since Spanglish arises independently in each region, it reflects the locally spoken varieties of English and Spanish. In general different varieties of Spanglish are not necessarily mutually intelligible. In Mexican and Chicano Spanish the common term for "Spanglish" is "Pocho".

Urdu
Urdish (a portmanteau of the words "Urdu" and "English") is used, when referring to code-switching between the two languages (this also applies to other varieties of Hindustani, including Hindi). Standard Urdu includes a limited amount of anglicisms. However, many urban Urdu speakers tend to use many more anglicisms when code-switching in speech. In standard written Urdu, anglicisms and code-switching are not common.  

Examples:
  (Standard Urdu:  /

See also
 Barbarism (grammar)
 Influence of French on English
 Béarlachas (False Irish)
 Calque
 Eurospeak
 Engrish
 Loanword
 Pseudo-anglicism
 Americanism (disambiguation)

References

External links 

 Les emprunts à l’anglais is the thematic section on anglicisms of the Banque de dépannage linguistique ("Linguistic Troubleshooting Bank") of the Office québécois de la langue française, including explanations of the various anglicism types (e.g. Qu'est-ce qu'un emprunt intégral?)
 Lazaro Observatory, an observatory of anglicism usage in the Spanish press.

English language
English as a global language
Types of words
Word coinage
Transliteration
False friends